Tyler Kristopher Capps  (born September 27, 1983) is an American professional golfer who currently plays on PGA Tour Latinoamérica.

Amateur career
Prior to turning professional in 2008, Capps represented the University of Nebraska–Lincoln at college level and twice qualified for the U.S. Amateur.

Professional career
From 2008 to 2013, Capps played mainly played on U.S. mini-tours including the Adams Pro Tour and NGA Pro Golf Tour. For the 2014 season, Capps joined PGA Tour Latinoamérica and achieved his first win on the tour at the Roberto De Vicenzo Invitational Copa NEC on April 27, 2014 following a three hole playoff.

Professional wins (1)

PGA Tour Latinoamérica wins (1)

References

External links

American male golfers
Nebraska Cornhuskers men's golfers
PGA Tour Latinoamérica golfers
Golfers from Colorado
Golfers from Florida
People from Highlands Ranch, Colorado
People from Palm Coast, Florida
1983 births
Living people